Marja-Leena Mikkola (born 18 March 1939 in Salo, Finland) is a Finnish writer and recipient of the Eino Leino Prize in 1967.

References

1939 births
Living people
People from Salo, Finland
Writers from Southwest Finland
Finnish writers
Finnish women writers
Communist Party of Finland politicians
Recipients of the Eino Leino Prize